Dąbrówka Grzybowska is a neighbourhood in the city of Warsaw, Poland, located within the district of Białołęka, in the Municipal Information System area of Białołęka Dworska.

History 
Dąbrówka Grzybowska was founded in 13th century, as a landed property of the local nobility, and between 16th century, it was a folwark-type settlement belonging to nearby Tarchomin.

In 20th century, Dąbrówka Grzybowska used to be a small village near the city of Warsaw. On 15 May 1951, it had been incorporated into Warsaw.

References 

Neighbourhoods of Białołęka
Populated places established in the 13th century